Ostaszewo may refer to the following places:
Ostaszewo, Kuyavian-Pomeranian Voivodeship (north-central Poland)
Ostaszewo, Masovian Voivodeship (east-central Poland)
Ostaszewo, Pomeranian Voivodeship (north Poland)
Ostaszewo, Warmian-Masurian Voivodeship (north Poland)